The Paraguayan Metropolitan Basketball League is the most important basketball league from Paraguay. As of 2015, 12 teams are participating in the league. The yearly winners of this league are considered the Paraguayan basketball champions, although only teams from Asunción compete (teams from other departments compete in the National League). Because of this, the champion gets the right to play in the South American Club Championship.

History
Amidst the 2020 COVID-19 pandemic, it was announced that the Liga Nacional would return on 22 July 2020. Basket Paraguayo informed that all games would be played at the Polideportivo at the Secretaria Nacional de Deportes.

2021 LNB teams
The team playing in the 2021 LNB season.

 Olimpia Kings
 San José
 Libertad
 Club Atlético Ciudad Nueva
 Sol de América 
 Federación de Básquetbol de Colonias Unidas
 Club Deportivo Campoalto
 Atlético Paranaense de la Federación Encarnacena de Básquetbol
 San Alfonso de la Federación de Básquetbol de Minga Guazú

List of Champions

Titles by team
 Olimpia 32 titles
 Deportivo San José 12 titles
 Sol de América 11 titles
 Libertad 9 titles
 Ciudad Nueva 9 titles
 Rowing Club 4 titles
 Club Guaraní 2 titles
 Cerro Porteño 2 title
 Nacional Asunción 1 title
 América de Pilar 1 title
 CNR El Mbiguá 1 title

See also
Paraguayan Basketball Federation

References

External links
Paraguayan league on Latinbasket.com 

Basketball competitions in Paraguay
Paraguay